Cavan Cola was a brand of soft drink produced by Cavan Mineral Water Ltd. in the town of Cavan, Ireland. It was introduced in 1958, and was sold in 250 ml and 710 ml bottles in shops in counties Cavan, Monaghan, Sligo, Leitrim, Louth , Donegal and Meath. The product proved so popular there that it went national in the early 1990s. In 1993, the still family-run Cavan Mineral Water Ltd. was taken over by Finches, who began phasing out Cavan Cola. By 2001, Cavan Cola had disappeared from most shops, even in County Cavan.

Product
Cavan Cola was sold in small 250ml bottles, with a distinctive green "book" label. The taste was described as being slightly sweeter than Coca-Cola, with a slightly liquorice flavour. It was popular in Cavan, and at the peak of its popularity (late 1980s/early 1990s), the product often outsold global brands (like Coke and Pepsi) in shops in County Cavan and County Leitrim and the surrounding area.

Revival Attempts
Cavan Cola was finally withdrawn in 2001. It has been the subject of several campaigns to revive it, but the new parent company of Cavan Mineral Water has thus far refused to bring it back. For a short time in the late 1990s, Cavan Cola was produced in Dublin. 

Cola brands
Defunct drink brands
Irish brands
Products introduced in 1958